Dominik Burusic (born 17 March 1993) is an Austrian footballer.

External links
 

Austrian footballers
Austrian Football Bundesliga players
FC Bayern Munich II players
FC Admira Wacker Mödling players
1993 births
Living people
Association football forwards